Mooretown may refer to:
Canada
Mooretown, Ontario
Ireland
Mooretown, County Westmeath, a townland in the barony of Delvin
Jamaica

 Moore Town, Jamaica
United States
Feather Falls, California, formerly Mooretown
Mooretown, Shreveport, Louisiana
Mooretown, Virginia
Mooretown Rancheria of Maidu Indians

See also
Mooreton, North Dakota